Threonine aspartase 1 is an enzyme that in humans is encoded by the TASP1 gene.

Function 

This gene encodes an endopeptidase that cleaves specific substrates following aspartate residues. The encoded protein undergoes posttranslational autoproteolytic processing to generate alpha and beta subunits, which reassemble into the active alpha2-beta2 heterotetramer. It is required to cleave MLL, a protein required for the maintenance of HOX gene expression, and TFIIA, a basal transcription factor. Cleavage of TFIIA has been found to drive spermatogenesis.

Alternatively spliced transcript variants have been described, but their biological validity has not been determined.

Clinical significance 

Taspase1 is overexpressed in primary human cancers and functions as a non-oncogene addiction protease that coordinates cancer cell proliferation and apoptosis. Therefore, Taspase1 may serve as a novel anti-cancer therapeutic target.

References

Further reading